Riding the Bus with My Sister is a 2005 television film that aired on CBS as part of the Hallmark Hall of Fame anthology series, based on the 2002 memoir of the same name by Rachel Simon. The film, like the book, is about the time Simon spent with her sister Beth, who has a developmental disability, and whose lifestyle revolves around riding buses in her home city of Reading, Pennsylvania. Andie MacDowell plays Rachel Simon, while Rosie O'Donnell plays Beth. It was directed by Anjelica Huston, with a screenplay by Joyce Eliason.

Riding the Bus with My Sister was filmed in Hamilton, Ontario, Canada.

Plot
Beth, a woman with an intellectual disability, is dependent on her father, and spends her days riding the fixed route buses in the city of Reading, Pennsylvania where she lives. When her father dies, her sister Rachel comes to stay with her. At first, they fight about Beth's rampant consumption of junk food, resulting in bringing her cholesterol levels up, but after six months Rachel realizes that Beth is content with her life.

Differences from the book
Many aspects of the book were altered for the film.  These include turning Rachel into a fashion photographer, eliminating an older sister and changing the name of the brother, and having the sisters' father die early in the story (whereas, in real life, he was still alive when the movie aired). The civil rights aspect of the story was also less explicit, the backstory was compressed, both characters were presented as more extreme than they are in the book, and several other characters were composites.

Cast

Andie MacDowell - Rachel Simon
Rosie O'Donnell - Beth Simon
Richard T. Jones - Jesse
D.W. Moffett - Rick
Boyd Banks - Henry
Tom Barnett - Bobby
Peter Cockett - Sam
Raven Dauda - Shane
Jayne Eastwood - Estella
Allegra Fulton - Vera
Shauna MacDonald - Nona
Roberta Maxwell - Valerie
Vijay Mehta - Pradlip
Charles Officer - Xavier
Simon Reynolds - Morros
Angelo Tsarouchas - Mean Eugene

Reception
Unlike the book, the film received negative reviews. O'Donnell's performance as Beth has been criticized for being "over the top." Howard Stern, Variety, and Opie and Anthony all commented that O'Donnell sounded like Pee-Wee Herman.

Simon said of the movie: "It's a poignant, moving, and powerful film. It also portrays both characters, as well as the struggles of the special sibling relationship, in a more realistic way than we usually get to see in film, and presents bus drivers as the everyday heroes that I now know them to be.  In addition, the movie highlights some of the main themes from my book: Beth's right to live her life by her own choices, the importance of public transportation for a fully independent life, the essential need for friendships in the community, and the challenges and rewards of the sibling bond."

Awards
In 2006 the film was nominated for a Young Artist Award for Best Family Television Movie or Special.

See also
 List of Hallmark Hall of Fame episodes

References

External links

 

2005 television films
2005 films
Films shot in Hamilton, Ontario
Films directed by Anjelica Huston
CBS network films
Hallmark Hall of Fame episodes
Films scored by Stewart Copeland
Films about intellectual disability
Films set in Pennsylvania
Films about sisters
2000s English-language films
Films about disability